Revolution Hospital is the largest hospital in Yemen, located in the capital of Sana'a, immediately southwest of Ghumdan Palace. It is one of the largest building complexes in the city.

This hospital may also be known as Al Thawra Revolution Hospital.

See also
Health in Yemen

References

Buildings and structures in Sanaa
Hospitals in Yemen